Mackenzie, Mckenzie, MacKenzie, or McKenzie may refer to:

People
 Mackenzie (given name), a given name (including a list of people with the name)
 Mackenzie (surname), a surname (including a list of people with the name)
 Clan Mackenzie, a Scottish clan

Places

Cities, towns and roads

Australia 
 Mackenzie, Queensland, a suburb of Brisbane
 Mackenzie, Queensland (Central Highlands), a locality in the Central Highlands Region
 Lake McKenzie, a perched lake in Queensland

Canada 
 Mackenzie (provincial electoral district), a former constituency in British Columbia
 Mackenzie, British Columbia, near Williston Lake in east central British Columbia
 Mackenzie, Ontario, on Thunder Bay in west central Ontario
 Mackenzie Mountains, a mountain range in northern Canada
 District of Mackenzie, a former administrative district of Canada's Northwest Territories

Alberta
 Mackenzie County, a specialized municipality in northwestern Alberta
 Mackenzie Highway, in Alberta
 McKenzie Lake, Calgary, a neighbourhood in Calgary, Alberta
 McKenzie Towne, Calgary, a neighbourhood in Calgary, Alberta

United States 
 McKenzie, Alabama
 McKenzie, Maryland
 Mackenzie, Missouri, a suburb of St. Louis
 McKenzie, North Dakota, an unincorporated community in Burleigh County
 McKenzie, Tennessee
 McKenzie County, North Dakota
 Glacial Lake McKenzie, in North Dakota
 Point MacKenzie, Alaska, a census-designated place in Matanuska-Susitna Borough

Guyana 
 Mackenzie, Guyana, a township of Linden, Guyana

Bodies of water 
 MacKenzie Bay, Antarctica
 Mackenzie Bay, Canada, Northwest Territories/Yukon, Canada
 Mackenzie Bay, Greenland
 Mackenzie River (disambiguation)
 McKenzie River (disambiguation)

Bodies of land 
 Mackenzie Basin, a central South Island of New Zealand
 Mackenzie Island (Eilean Mhic Coinnich), Scotland
 Mackenzie Island (Western Australia), an island of Western Australia
 Mackenzie King Island, Queen Elizabeth Islands, Northwest Territories/Nunavut, Canada (named for the Mackenzie King families of William Lyon Mackenzie King)
 Mackenzie Mountains, southeast Northwest Territories, Canada
 Mackenzie Peninsula, South Orkney Islands

Geo-political 
 District of Mackenzie, a former Canadian administrative district
 Mackenzie District, a political district in South Island, New Zealand
 Mackenzie (electoral district), a former Canadian federal electoral district in Saskatchewan
 Mackenzie Valley Pipeline Inquiry, an oil pipeline impact inquiry committee
 Powell River-Sunshine Coast, a Canadian provincial electoral district in British Columbia, called "Mackenzie" from 1924 to 1991

Dogs 
 Mackenzie River husky, bred for pulling freight in the Arctic
 Spuds MacKenzie, Budweiser mascot (fictional character)
 Mackenzie, a fictional border collie character from the 2018 Australian animated television series, "Bluey"

Education 
 Mackenzie High School (disambiguation)
 McKenzie College (disambiguation)
 Universidade Presbiteriana Mackenzie, a private university in São Paulo, Brazil
 William Lyon Mackenzie Collegiate Institute, a public secondary school in Toronto, Ontario, Canada
 Bishop Mackenzie International School, a private international school in Lilongwe, Malawi

Geology 
 Mackenzie dike swarm, in the western Canadian Shield
 Mackenzie hotspot, in northern Canada

Legal 
 Baker McKenzie, law firm based in the US
 McKenzie friend, a British legal term

Music 
 "Sgt. MacKenzie", a 2000 lament written by Joseph Kilna MacKenzie
 A 'Father McKenzie' features in the well-known Beatles' song "Eleanor Rigby"
 Jenson McKenzie, a German rock band

Sports 
 Associação Atlética Mackenzie College, a defunct Brazilian association football club
 Mackenzie Esporte Clube, a recreational, cultural and sports club from Belo Horizonte, Brazil

Other uses 
 McKenzie & Co, a 1995 video game
 USS MacKenzie, several ships

See also